Sol Steinmetz (July 29, 1930 – October 13, 2010) was a Hungarian American linguistics and lexicography expert who wrote extensively about etymologies, definitions and uncovered earliest recorded usages of words in English and Yiddish. A widely sought source on all things lexical, he earned recognition from William Safire in his On Language column in The New York Times Magazine in 2006 as a "lexical supermaven".

Steinmetz was born in Budapest on July 29, 1930, and emigrated from Hungary before the outbreak of World War II to the United States, with brief intervals spent in the Dominican Republic and Venezuela. He earned his undergraduate degree from Yeshiva University with a major in English and received his semikhah (rabbinic ordination) from YU's Rabbi Isaac Elchanan Theological Seminary. He supported himself as a hazzan while he studied linguistics at Columbia University, where he trained under Yiddish scholar Uriel Weinreich, before leaving graduate school to take a post as rabbi of a synagogue in Media, Pennsylvania.

He worked for publishers Merriam-Webster and Clarence Barnhart before moving to Random House, where he oversaw Random House Webster's College Dictionary as the executive editor of the firm's dictionary division. As part of his lexicographical research, he found such first uses as the sense of the metonymous use of the word "suit" to mean a bureaucrat which he found attributed to a 1982 episode of Cagney and Lacey.

His work was sought out by reporters and writers and was widely cited in William Safire's On Language column in The New York Times Magazine, where he was credited as being a member of "Olbom" (On Language's Board of Octogenarian Mentors), despite his age. His writings include works on Yiddish such as the 1986 book Yiddish and English: A Century of Yiddish in America and the 2002 work Meshuggenary: Celebrating the World of Yiddish, which he wrote with Charles M. Levine and Payson R. Stevens. Books aimed at the general market include the 2008 release of Semantic Antics: How and Why Words Change Meaning, a book that Safire called his "favorite popular word book of the year", noting the derivations that Steinmetz provided for the words "cartel" and "nude". His final book was There's a Word for It: The Explosion of the American Language Since 1900, published by Harmony Books in the year he died.

A resident of New Rochelle, New York, died in Manhattan at the age of 80 on October 13, 2010, due to pneumonia. He was survived by his wife, the former Tzipora Mandel, whom he married in 1955, as well as three sons, 12 grandchildren and two great-grandchildren. Jesse Sheidlower of the Oxford English Dictionary credited Steinmetz as someone who "never had a bad word to say about anyone", despite the fact that "he knew a lot of bad words".

References

1930 births
2010 deaths
American lexicographers
Linguists from the United States
American Orthodox rabbis
Hungarian emigrants to the United States
Writers from Budapest
Scientists from New Rochelle, New York
Rabbi Isaac Elchanan Theological Seminary semikhah recipients
20th-century lexicographers
21st-century lexicographers
Deaths from pneumonia in New York (state)
Religious leaders from New Rochelle, New York
21st-century American Jews